The 1972 Lafayette Leopards football team was an American football team that represented Lafayette College as an independent during the 1972 NCAA College Division football season.

In their second year under head coach Neil Putnam, the Leopards compiled a 3–7 record. Steven Huntzinger and Donald Meyer were the team captains.

Lafayette played its home games at Fisher Field on College Hill in Easton, Pennsylvania.

Schedule

References

Lafayette
Lafayette Leopards football seasons
Lafayette Leopards football